The Catholic Belltower (also known as the Cathedral of Ponape Belltower; and Ponape Belltower) is a historic tower at the Catholic Mission in Kolonia, on the island of Pohnpei in the Federated States of Micronesia. The belltower and adjoining masonry apse are all that remain of a church built in 1909 by German Capuchin missionaries, when Ponape and the other Caroline Islands were administered as part of German New Guinea. The rest of the church was destroyed during the fighting of World War II. The tower has a foundation of basalt rock and lime mortar, and is constructed out of concrete bricks.

The tower and apse were listed on the United States National Register of Historic Places in 1980.

References

National Register of Historic Places in the Federated States of Micronesia
Churches completed in 1909
Towers completed in 1909
Roman Catholic churches in the Federated States of Micronesia
Buildings and structures on the National Register of Historic Places in the Federated States of Micronesia
Roman Catholic cathedrals in the Federated States of Micronesia